Anuar Mohamed Tuhami (born 15 January 1995), simply known as Anuar, is a professional footballer who plays as a central midfielder for Spanish club Real Valladolid. Born in Spain, Anuar represents the Morocco national team.

Club career
Born in Ceuta, Anuar finished his formation at Real Valladolid, and made his senior debuts with the reserves in the 2012–13 campaign in Tercera División, aged only 17.

Anuar made his first-team debut on 15 October 2014, replacing Álvaro Rubio in the 77th minute of a 2–0 home win over Girona FC for the season's Copa del Rey. He made his Segunda División debut on 1 May 2016, coming on as a substitute for Vincenzo Rennella in a 1–1 home draw against CD Lugo.

On 12 November 2017, after becoming a regular starter under new manager Luis César Sampedro, Anuar renewed his contract until 2020. He scored his first professional goal on 19 December, netting the first in a 3–2 home win against Real Zaragoza.

Anuar contributed with one goal in 29 appearances (play-offs included) as his side achieved promotion to La Liga. He made his debut in the main category of Spanish football on 17 August 2018, starting in a 0–0 away draw against Girona.

On 13 January 2020, Anuar joined Superleague Greece side Panathinaikos on a six-month loan contract. On 7 September, he switched teams and countries again after agreeing to a one-year loan deal with APOEL FC of the Cypriot First Division.

International career
Born in Spain, Anuar is of Moroccan descent. He represented the Morocco national football team in a 1–1 friendly tie with Burkina Faso on 6 September 2019.

Career statistics

Club

References

External links

1995 births
Living people
People from Ceuta
Spanish sportspeople of Moroccan descent
Moroccan footballers
Spanish footballers
Association football midfielders
La Liga players
Segunda División players
Segunda División B players
Tercera División players
Real Valladolid Promesas players
Real Valladolid players
Super League Greece players
Panathinaikos F.C. players
APOEL FC players
Morocco international footballers
Moroccan expatriate footballers
Spanish expatriate footballers
Moroccan expatriate sportspeople in Greece
Spanish expatriate sportspeople in Greece
Spanish expatriate sportspeople in Cyprus
Expatriate footballers in Greece
Expatriate footballers in Cyprus